R-tools are a set of Unix/Linux tools that allow basic unsecured administration of Unix/Linux systems by establishing a Remote Shell. Similar in nature to Telnet but much less popular, R-tools is considered by most IT professionals to be dangerous and obsolete. The much preferred way to do a remote shell is ssh.

R-tools connection
R-tools connects over TCP port 513 with the command rlogin, r-tools is considered to be insecure because it can be configured to only require a hostname and username; transmissions using r-tools are not encrypted.

R-tools commands
rlogin is the command used to establish a remote shell.
rsh will login, execute a command and immediately log back out.
rcp will login, copy a file and immediately log back out.
rwho is a command similar to finger that will output a list of logged-in users.
rexec is similar to rsh but runs on port 512 and uses different syntax.

Unix network-related software